Welcome to the Real World is a live album by the band Trapeze released in 1998. This album is from the reunion tour of 1992 of the original line-up of Trapeze of Mel Galley, Glenn Hughes & Dave Holland with the addition of Asia and Yes keyboard player, Geoff Downes.

Track listing

  "You Are The Music" – 5:18
  "Way Back To The Bone" – 6:36
  "Welcome To The Real World" – 5:49
  "Coast To Coast" – 5:50
  "Midnight Flyer" – 6:51
  "Homeland" – 6:20
  "Touch My Life" – 6:31
  "Your Love Is Alright" – 8:30
  "Black Cloud" – 7:20

Personnel
Dave Holland
Glenn Hughes
Mel Galley
Geoff Downes

References

Trapeze (band) albums
1993 live albums